Highland Avenue is an active commuter railroad station in the city of Orange, Essex County, New Jersey. One of two in the city, along with the eponymous Orange station, Highland Avenue is serviced by trains of New Jersey Transit's Morris and Essex Lines: the Morristown Line and Gladstone Branch. Trains through the station run between New York Penn Station and Hoboken Terminal to the east and Hackettstown and Gladstone. The station contains two low-level side platforms for the three tracks that run through the station. 

The station opened as Orange Valley as a stop on the Morris and Essex Railroad, using that name until 1890.

Station layout
The station has two low-level side platforms serving the outer tracks. The north platform has a walkway over the Track 3 to access Track 1, though trains on Track 1 do not typically stop at this station and is instead used as an express track.

References

External links

 Mitchell Street entrance from Google Maps Street View
 Stetson Street entrance from Google Maps Street View
 Station House from Google Maps Street View
 Freeman Street entrance from Google Maps Street View

NJ Transit Rail Operations stations
Railway stations in Essex County, New Jersey
Former Delaware, Lackawanna and Western Railroad stations
Orange, New Jersey
Railway stations in the United States opened in 1858